KUTP (channel 45), branded on-air as Fox 10 Xtra, is a television station in Phoenix, Arizona, United States, broadcasting the MyNetworkTV programming service. It is owned and operated by Fox Television Stations alongside Fox outlet KSAZ-TV (channel 10). Both stations share studios on West Adams Street in Downtown Phoenix, while KUTP's transmitter is located atop South Mountain.

History

Early years
In May 1984, the Federal Communications Commission (FCC) allocated channel 45 to Phoenix and began taking applications for the channel after United Television, a subsidiary of Chris-Craft Industries, petitioned for the additional slot. United soon got competition for the channel from another twelve applicants, Undeterred, United bought out all of the competitors for a reported $5 million and won a construction permit on December 20, 1984.

United immediately set out to bring Phoenix its third independent station. It originally proposed to become KOLT-TV (as in "Kolt 45"), but United could not convince radio station KOLT in Scottsbluff, Nebraska, to give it the rights to share the designation. On December 23, 1985, a year after obtaining the construction permit, KUTP came to air. Along with movies and syndicated programs, United commissioned a revival of The Lloyd Thaxton Show, last seen in Los Angeles in the late 1960s, as a centerpiece of its programming efforts. In 1988, United made an even more consequential pickup, one that served as the face of the station for viewers for more than 20 years: road games of the Phoenix Suns.

Under United Television ownership, the station carried programming from the Prime Time Entertainment Network programming service from January 1993 to January 1995. In the fall of 1994, United Television and Paramount Pictures announced the formation of the United Paramount Network (UPN), lining up independent stations that were owned by both companies at the time as charter affiliates; KUTP affiliated with UPN upon the network's January 16, 1995, debut.

In 2000, Paramount parent company Viacom bought Chris-Craft's 50% ownership interest in UPN (which Chris-Craft had wholly owned, until Viacom acquired a stake in the network in 1996); the deal effectively stripped KUTP of its status as one of the network's owned-and-operated stations in the process. On August 12 of that year, Chris-Craft sold its UPN stations to the Fox Television Stations subsidiary of News Corporation for $5.5 billion; this resulted in the creation of Phoenix's second television duopoly with KSAZ. KUTP merged its operations with KSAZ into that station's studio facilities on West Adams Street.

From UPN to MyNetworkTV

On January 24, 2006, the Warner Bros. unit of Time Warner and CBS Corporation announced that the two companies would shut down UPN and The WB and combine the networks' respective programming to create a new jointly owned broadcast network called The CW.

In unveiling the merged network, while WB and UPN affiliates owned by WB minority stakeholder Tribune Broadcasting and by CBS Television Stations were announced as charter outlets, none of the Fox-owned UPN stations—many of which were competitors to these stations—were chosen. Even though neither of these groups were present in Phoenix, as with the rest of the chain, Fox took immediate steps to remove UPN branding and promotions from KUTP, which branded as "PHX 45" for six months. The next month, News Corporation then announced the creation of its own secondary network, MyNetworkTV, to serve its own outgoing UPN stations as well as those that had not been selected for The CW. (Phoenix's WB affiliate, KASW, then signed an affiliation agreement with The CW.) Coinciding with the September 2006 launch of MyNetworkTV, Fox announced that KUTP would begin producing a local interactive dating show, My Dating Place, which aired on weeknights.

On August 7, 2017, KUTP was re-branded as Fox 10 Xtra, a brand extension of KSAZ-TV, adding a two-hour block of the latter's live streaming YouTube channel Fox 10 News Now Monday through Friday between 10 a.m. and 12 noon.

Local programming

Newscasts

KSAZ-TV produces a 7 p.m. newscast, Fox 10 Xtra News at 7, for air on KUTP; this program, the station's first regular newscast, debuted in July 2018. In addition, the station airs two hours of LiveNow from Fox, the Fox television stations' over-the-top streaming news offering, which originated as Fox 10 News Now in Phoenix.

In February 2022, KUTP began simulcast programming from Fox Weather. This programming airs from 1 to 2 p.m. on weekdays, and from 4 to 6 a.m. on Sundays.

Sports programming
For 23 years, from 1988 to 2011, KUTP served as the over-the-air television home of the NBA's Phoenix Suns, televising all road games that did not have exclusive rights held by a national broadcast or cable television network, as well as selected home games, averaging at least 45 game telecasts each season. KUTP produced its own broadcast graphics, in conjunction with the Suns until the 2010–11 NBA season; this role of the regional television broadcaster of Suns games was taken over thereafter by corporate sibling Fox Sports Arizona (now Bally Sports Arizona), starting with the 2011–12 season.

Basketball returned to channel 45 in 2019 when Grand Canyon University entered into a deal to move men's basketball coverage from YurView Arizona, a cable channel, to KUTP; the games are produced by Sneaky Big Studios for GCU and KUTP. The agreement was renewed for the 2021–22 season, adding women's basketball and men's baseball broadcasts. The agreement was expanded for the 2022–23 season, adding a softball broadcast for the first time.

Technical information

Subchannels
The station's digital signal is multiplexed:

Analog-to-digital conversion
KUTP shut down its analog signal, over UHF channel 45, at 8:30 a.m. on June 12, 2009, the official date in which full-power television stations in the United States transitioned from analog to digital broadcasts under federal mandate. The station's digital signal continued to broadcast on its pre-transition UHF channel 26. Through the use of PSIP, digital television receivers display the station's virtual channel as its former UHF analog channel 45.

Translators

References

External links
 

Fox Television Stations
Buzzr affiliates
Movies! affiliates
MyNetworkTV affiliates
Decades (TV network) affiliates
Start TV affiliates
Television channels and stations established in 1985
1985 establishments in Arizona
UTP